John Candler (born 13 December 1939) is a British diver. He competed at the 1960 Summer Olympics and the 1964 Summer Olympics.

References

External links
 
 

1939 births
Living people
British male divers
Olympic divers of Great Britain
Divers at the 1960 Summer Olympics
Divers at the 1964 Summer Olympics
Sportspeople from Scarborough, North Yorkshire